Cyamopsis is a genus of the family Fabaceae. Its species are distributed across Africa, Asia and the Pacific.

Species
Cyamopsis comprises the following species:
 Cyamopsis dentata (N.E.Br.) Torre

 Cyamopsis senegalensis Guill. & Perr.
 Cyamopsis serrata Schinz

 Cyamopsis tetragonoloba (L.) Taub.—guar

References

External links

Indigofereae
Flora of the Southwestern Pacific
Flora of tropical Asia
Fabaceae genera